The elusive antpitta (Grallaria eludens) is a species of bird in the family Grallariidae. It is found in Brazil and Peru.

Its natural habitat is subtropical or tropical moist lowland forest. It is threatened by habitat loss.

References

elusive antpitta
Birds of the Amazon Basin
Birds of the Peruvian Amazon
elusive antpitta
Taxonomy articles created by Polbot